Blæsedalen (Greenlandic:  Itinneq Kangilleq) is a large glacial valley on Disko Island, Western Greenland. The north-south U-formed valley features include icing ridges and a braided river system; Røde Elv (red river) has red sediment, which colours its water. The valley is fed by outlet-glaciers from Lyngemarkens Iskappe. Between Blæsedalen and Grønlænderhuse, there is evidence of Paleoinuit and Thule Culture habitation.

References

Bibliography

Valleys of Greenland
Qeqertalik
Disko Island